The 1874 United Kingdom general election saw the incumbent Liberals, led by William Gladstone, lose decisively, even though it won a majority of the votes cast.  Benjamin Disraeli's Conservatives won the majority of seats in the House of Commons, largely because they won a number of uncontested seats. It was the first Conservative victory in a general election since 1841.  Gladstone's decision to call an election surprised his colleagues, for they were aware of large sectors of discontent in their coalition. For example, the nonconformists were upset with education policies; many working-class people disliked the new trade union laws and the restrictions on drinking. The Conservatives were making gains in the middle-class, Gladstone wanted to abolish the income tax, but failed to carry his own cabinet. The result was a disaster for the Liberals, who went from 387 MPs to only 242. Conservatives jumped from 271 to 350. For the first time, the Irish nationalists were elected. Gladstone himself noted: "We have been swept away in a torrent of gin and beer".

The election saw the Irish of the Home Rule League become the first significant third party in Parliament, with 60 of 101 of the seats for Ireland. This had been the first general election that used a secret ballot following the 1872 Secret Ballot Act. The Irish Nationalist gains could well be attributed to the effects of the Secret Ballot Act, as tenants faced less of a threat of eviction if they voted against the wishes of their landlords. Also I n this election, the first two working-class MPs were elected: Alexander MacDonald and Thomas Burt, both members of the Miners' Union, were elected as Liberal-Labour (Lib–Lab) MPs in Stafford and Morpeth, respectively.  The 1867 Reform Act eroded the legislative power of the rural gentry. The 1874 election, especially in Ireland, saw great landowners losing their county seats to tenant farmers.

This is the only time since the introduction of the secret ballot that a party has been defeated despite receiving an absolute majority of the popular vote. This was primarily because over 100 Conservative candidates were elected unopposed. This meant no votes were cast in those 100 places where the Conservative candidates were anticipated to be popular; in the seats where Liberal candidates did stand, they polled a high proportion of the vote on average.

The election saw 652 MPs elected, six fewer than at the previous election. Following allegations of corruption, the Conservative-held constituencies of Beverley and Sligo Borough, and the Liberal-held constituencies of Bridgwater and Cashel, had been abolished.

Results

|}

Voting summary

Seats summary

Regional results

Great Britain

England

Scotland

Wales

Ireland

Universities

See also
 List of MPs elected in the 1874 United Kingdom general election
 1874 United Kingdom general election in Ireland

Notes

References and further reading

 
 
 McIntyre, William David. "Disraeli's election blunder: The straits of Malacca issue in the 1874 election." Culture, Theory and Critique 5.1 (1961): 76-105.
 
 
 
 Roberts, Matthew. "Election Cartoons and Political Communication In Victorian England" Cultural & Social History (2013) 10#3 pp 369–395, covers 1860 to 1890.

 
1874 elections in the United Kingdom
General election
1874
January 1874 events
February 1874 events